Yee Xin Ying (born 12 November 2003 in Sandakan), also known as Yee Ying, is a Malaysian professional squash player. As of August 2022, she was ranked number 91 in the world.

Career
In 2022, she won a bronze at the 2022 Women's World Team Squash Championships.

References

2003 births
Living people
Malaysian female squash players